Land was a Scottish Christian music band, who played a worship style of acoustic folk music with folk rock and roots rock elements. They were from a four-piece band from Glasgow, Scotland, where they released three independently-made albums.

Background
The Glasgow, Scotland-band worship band was a four-piece ensemble, who were Steve Knott, Yvonne Whitty, Diane MacLeod, and Shirley-Anne Nolan.

Music history
The group formed in 1997, with their first album, Down the Mountain Slowly, releasing the same year. Their subsequent album, Rain in the Springtime, was released the following year, in 1998. They released, Point Me to the Skies, in 1999, where this was their final album, before they disbanded the next year.

Members
Members
 Steve Knott
 Yvonne Whitty
 Diane MacLeod
 Shirley-Anne Nolan

Discography
Albums
 Down the Mountain Slowly (1997)
 Rain in the Springtime (1998)
 Point Me to the Skies (1999)

References

External links
 Cross Rhythms artist profile

Musical groups established in 1997
Musical groups disestablished in 2000